David Dinis Magalhães (born 24 February 1988 in Luanda, Angola) is a retired Angolan footballer. He played as a forward. He used to be a member of Angolan internationals.

International career
In 2010 Africa Cup of Nations, he was called to Angola national football team by head coach Manuel José de Jesus.

Honours 
 Girabola: 2008, 2009
 SuperTaça de Angola: 2009, 2010

References

External links

1988 births
Living people
Footballers from Luanda
Angolan footballers
Angola international footballers
2010 Africa Cup of Nations players
Atlético Petróleos de Luanda players
Atlético Sport Aviação players
C.D. Primeiro de Agosto players
C.R. Caála players
Domant FC players
Progresso Associação do Sambizanga players
Progresso da Lunda Sul players
Girabola players
Association football forwards